The discography of American rapper Gunna consists of three studio albums, five mixtapes, 38 singles, 46 other charted songs and 93 guest appearances. His debut mixtape as Yung Gunna, titled Hard Body, was released on June 16, 2013. His debut mixtape as Gunna titled Drip Season was released on October 14, 2016, and throughout the years, became a series. Two years later, Drip Harder, a collaborative work with American rapper and friend Lil Baby, was released on October 5, 2018, as a collaborative mixtape. It debuted and peaked at 4 on the Billboard 200.

His debut studio album Drip or Drown 2 was released via fellow rapper Young Thug-led record label YSL on February 22, 2019. It debuted and peaked at number three on the Billboard 200.

Albums

Studio albums

Compilation albums

Mixtapes

As Yung Gunna

As Gunna

Extended plays

Singles

As lead artist

As featured artist

Other charted and certified songs

Guest appearances

Notes

References 

Discographies of American artists
Hip hop discographies